The Group may refer to:

Film and television
 The Group (Australian TV series), 1971 situation comedy produced by Cash Harmon Television for ATN7
 The Group (Canadian TV series), 1968–70 music variety on CBC Television
 The Group (film), 1966 feature directed by Sidney Lumet, based on the novel

Literature
 The Group (literature), a group of British poets of the late 1950s and early 1960s
 The Group (novel), 1963 book by Mary McCarthy
 The Group, a play by Mercy Otis Warren of 1775

Other
 The Group, a 1978–1981 Finnish prog band led by Pekka Pohjola
 The Group (theater), a theatrical company formed in 1964
 The Group, a collection of non-player characters in The Legend of Zelda: Twilight Princess
 The Group, an intentional community based on G. I. Gurdjieff's Fourth Way
 The Group, a religious sect led by Theodore Rinaldo in Snohomish, Washington, USA
 The Group (New Zealand art), a circle of influential New Zealand artists of the 1920s to 1970s